The Coscinaraeidae are a family of stony corals found in the Indo-Pacific region.

Genera 
The World Register of Marine Species lists the following genera:

Anomastraea  Marenzeller, 1901
Coscinaraea  Milne Edwards & Haime, 1848
Craterastrea  Head, 1983
Horastrea  Pichon, 1971

References

 
Scleractinia
Cnidarian families